This is a list of Live with Regis and Kelly episodes which were broadcast during the show's 18th season.  The list is ordered by air date.

Although the co-hosts may have read a couple of e-mails during the broadcast, it does not necessarily count as a "Regis and Kelly Inbox" segment.

September 2005

October 2005

November 2005

December 2005

January 2006

February 2006

March 2006

April 2006

May 2006

June 2006

July 2006

August 2006

See also
 Live with Regis and Kelly
 Live with Regis and Kelly (season 19)
 Live with Regis and Kelly (season 20)
 Live with Regis and Kelly (season 21)
 Live with Regis and Kelly (season 22)

References

2005 American television seasons
2006 American television seasons